The Chiadma are an Arab or Arabized Berber tribe located on the Atlantic coast of Morocco in the region between Safi and Essaouira.

Territory
The Chiadma territory is divided into two regions. The western portion lies between the sacred mountain of Regraga, Djebel Hadid, and the Atlantic Ocean coastal plain of the Sahel. This area is known for its mariners, and its farmers raise garden crops, providing the local market with vegetables, fruits and fish. Olive oil, grain and livestock are produced in the eastern Kabla region.

Celebrations
Regraga
The Chiadma annually celebrate a 40-day pilgrimage, the Regraga, in spring. During these weeks, pilgrims visit a series of local shrines from the mouth of the Tensift river south of Safi to the northern outskirts of the High Atlas Mountains, and including the city of Essaouira itself. They are led by two groups on a round trip stopping at every shrine on the way. One group must dress at every shrine a holy tent made of fan palm fibres and dyed with henna, the other group arrives in a procession with a muqaddim (religious leader) riding a white horse.

Laâroussa
During droughts in the countryside around Essaouira, it is traditional to carry into the fields a white puppet decorated with white flower blossoms, called the Laâroussa Chta (لعروسة شتى ) in Arabic: Laâroussa meaning "the bride on her wedding day", and Chta meaning "rain".

References

Moroccan tribes